"Mindbender" is the fourteenth episode aired of the first series of UFO - a 1970 British television science fiction series about an alien invasion of Earth. The screenplay was written by Tony Barwick and the director was Ken Turner. The episode was filmed from 30 June to 10 July 1970 and aired on the ATV Midlands on 13 January 1971. Though shown as the fourteenth episode, it was actually the twenty-fifth to have been filmed.

The series was created by Gerry Anderson and Sylvia Anderson with Reg Hill, and produced by the Andersons and Lew Grade's Century 21 Productions for Grade's ITC Entertainment company.

Story
During a period of intense sunspot activity which leaves Moonbase and Earth vulnerable to alien attack, a UFO hugs the lunar surface in an apparent effort to strike at Moonbase.  However, it suddenly veers away and self-destructs. Interceptor pilots Conroy and Dale are sent out investigate; they find nothing to explain the alien craft's destruction but Conroy locates a curious diamond-like moon rock, which he keeps as a souvenir.

However, when Conroy re-enters the Control Sphere on Moonbase he hallucinates that there are three Mexican bandits there. He starts to fight the bandits, unaware that he is actually fighting Nina Barry and other Moonbase operatives. Barry sets off an alarm but Conroy shoots and kills Dale. A search is ordered and Conroy is killed in the ensuing gun fight.

Straker investigates Conroy's strange behaviour but can find nothing to explain it; the only connection Straker can make is that Conroy had an interest in the Old West and wrote Westerns in his spare time. Conroy's personal effects are returned to SHADO headquarters where they are sorted by Capt. "Beaver" James, a much admired retired astronaut. Upon touching Conroy's moon rock James also falls under its control and believes that SHADO HQ has been invaded by aliens: he gains possession of a guard's gun and starts shooting everyone he sees. James is subsequently killed after taking Col. Lake hostage: tragically James' gun was out of ammunition and had the guards known this, he could have been taken alive.

The moon rock is still on Straker's desk and he picks it up instead of the glass paperweight he usually holds from habit during discussions in his office.  Straker gets into an argument with Henderson over funding but just as the situation becomes heated, a film director shouts 'Cut' and Straker finds himself as an actor on a set. Straker wanders the film sets, which include the Moonbase control desk and Skydiver's Command And Control Centre. He returns to the set representing his office and the argument with Henderson continues. But in the heat of the moment he throws Conroy's moon rock against the wall, shattering it and eliminating its influence on him. Straker realises that the rock caused hallucinations in anyone who touched it and the UFO's destruction near Moonbase was in order to plant the rock on the surface.

Cast

Starring
 Ed Bishop — Commander Edward Straker
 Michael Billington — Col. Paul Foster
 Wanda Ventham — Col. Virginia Lake
 Dolores Mantez — Lt. Nina Barry
 Gary Myers— Capt. Lew Waterman
 Ayshea — Lt. Ayshea Johnson
 Norma Ronald — Miss Ealand

Also Starring
 Grant Taylor — Gen. James L. Henderson

Featuring
 Basil Dignam — Cabinet Minister	
 Stuart Damon — Howard Byrne	
 Bud Tingwell — Capt. Beaver James	
 Al Mancini — Lt. Andy Conroy	
 Craig Hunter — Lt. Dale	
 Steven Berkoff — Capt. Steve Minto	
 Anouska Hempel — SHADO Operative
 Suzanne Neve — Mary Rutland, Straker's ex-wife
 Barnaby Shaw — John Rutland, Straker's son	
 Philip Madoc — Steven Rutland		
 Stephan Chase — Film Director	
 Norton Clarke — First Assistant Director	
 Paul Greaves — Second Assistant Director	
 James Marcus — SHADO Operative	
 Peter Halliday — Dr. Segal
 Sylvia — Sylvia Anderson  (uncredited)

Production notes
The episode features scenes from two previous episodes: "Identified" and "A Question of Priorities". During the hallucinations suffered by Straker the 'actors' use their real names when talking to each other. In the movie studio filming sequence Sylvia Anderson has a cameo reading prompts and is referred to onscreen by her first name. The scenes of Straker's hallucinations blur the barrier between the "reality" of the UFO universe and the viewer's reality, effectively removing the fourth wall.

Locations used for the filming included Heatherden Hall and Gardens, Pinewood Studios; Studio Lot, Pinewood Studios; Burnham Beeches, Buckinghamshire; and Marlyn Cottage, Ley Hill.

References

External links

1971 British television episodes
UFO (TV series) episodes